Tazakend (also, Beyuk-Tazakend) is a village in the Bilasuvar Rayon of Azerbaijan.

References 

Populated places in Bilasuvar District